The Indian cricket team toured England in the 1967 season and played 18 first-class fixtures, winning only two, losing 7 and drawing 9.

India played three Test matches and lost the series to England 3-0. The Indian team was captained by Mansoor Ali Khan Pataudi, while Brian Close led the England side. England won the First Test by 6 wickets at Headingley; the Second at Lord's by an innings and 124 runs; and the Third at Edgbaston by 132 runs.

Test series

First Test

Second Test

Third Test

References

Annual reviews
 Playfair Cricket Annual 1968
 Wisden Cricketers' Almanack 1968

Further reading
 Bill Frindall, The Wisden Book of Test Cricket 1877-1978, Wisden, 1979

External links
 Tour home at ESPNcricinfo archive
 
 India to England 1967 at test-cricket-tours.co.uk

1967 in English cricket
1967 in Indian cricket
1967
International cricket competitions from 1960–61 to 1970